Springfield is a rural municipality (RM) in Manitoba, Canada. It stretches from urban industrial development on the eastern boundary of the City of Winnipeg, through urban, rural residential, agricultural and natural landscapes, to the Agassiz Provincial Forest on the municipality's eastern boundary. Birds Hill Provincial Park nestles into the north-western corner of Springfield.

Springfield's population was 16,142 as of the 2021 census, making it the second most populous RM in the province (slightly behind the RM of Hanover) and fifth most populous municipality overall (behind the cities of Winnipeg, Brandon, and Steinbach, and RM of Hanover).

History
The Springfield area is part of the traditional territory of Anishnaabe and Swampy Cree First Nations. In 1870, the area became part of the new province of Manitoba. In 1871, the area was covered under Treaty 1 between the British Crown and the First Nations. The treaty facilitated the settlement of southern Manitoba including agricultural settlements in the Springfield area.

Springfield was incorporated in 1880 as a result of changes made to the Rural Municipality of Springfield and Sunnyside (1873–1880). The municipality received its name due to the presence of multiple natural springs found within its borders. While farming is still important in the municipality, today many residents are employed in nearby Winnipeg.

Communities
 Anola
 Cooks Creek
 Dugald
 Glass
 Hazelridge
 Oakbank
 Ostenfeld
 Pine Ridge
 Sapton
 Vivian

Demographics 

Attractions 
The RM of Springfield contains many sites of historical and cultural significance such as the Sunnyside cemetery, the Springfield Hutterite colony, North Springfield school, Springfield Agricultural Society, and the Dugald rail accident site.

In 1996, the Ukrainian Catholic Church of the Immaculate Conception in Cooks Creek was designated a National Historic Site of Canada.

Government

Municipal
Springfield's administrative center is in Oakbank, the largest community in the RM. The RM is governed by a mayor and councillors representing the RM's five wards. The government has come under some scrutiny for having the highest compensation to mayor and council ($242,974 total for 2015) relative to all other municipalities in the Winnipeg capital region.

Provincial
The RM is represented by two ridings in the Manitoba Legislative Assembly: Springfield-Ritchot (west) and Dawson Trail (east). The former Springfield electoral district included all of the RM and parts of adjacent East St. Paul.

Federal
The RM is split between two federal ridings: Selkirk—Interlake—Eastman (north) and Provencher (south). From 1914 through 1966, a federal riding was also called "Springfield" with varying boundaries not always coterminous with the municipality.

References

Further reading
 Kraushar, Aileen, et al. 1974. Springfield 1st Rural Municipality in Manitoba 1873-1973. Dugald: Dugald Women's Institute. .

External links

 R.M. of Springfield (official site)
 Community Profile: Springfield Rural Municipality, Manitoba; Statistics Canada
 Map of Springfield R.M. at Statcan

Rural municipalities in Manitoba
Winnipeg Metro Region